Rhein-Neckar Air GmbH, commonly known as RNA, is a German company that offers regional scheduled flights out of Mannheim City Airport. All flights are operated by the German airline MHS Aviation. The company's tag line is Fliegen wie privat, which means like flying privately.

History
After Cirrus Airlines ceased operations in 2012, Mannheim City Airport was left without any scheduled airline service. Although well connected to Frankfurt Airport, the local economy demanded the re-establishment of direct flight connections from the Rhine-Neckar Metropolitan Region to other German cities. Rhein-Neckar Air was consequently founded as a LLC with the support of local companies such as SAP, Heidelberg Cement and Südzucker. 

Operations commenced on 10 March 2014, offering weekday flights between Mannheim City Airport and Berlin Tegel Airport. After a successful start, flights to Hamburg began later that year. Since 2016 RNA flies seasonally (April–October) to the island of Sylt, flights which were also offered from Münster/Osnabrück in 2016 and from Nuremberg in 2017; however both routes since ceased. The network has since been seasonally expanded with flights to Usedom which was also served from Kassel as of 2022.

According to the company 35,000 passengers used its service per year as of 2017, a figure that decreased to 22,000 by 2022.

Destinations

Current destinations 
As of January 2023, Rhein-Neckar Air serves the following scheduled destinations:

 Hamburg - Hamburg Airport 
 Kassel - Kassel Airport seasonal charter
 Mannheim - Mannheim City Airport base
 Sylt - Sylt Airport seasonal
 Usedom - Heringsdorf Airport  seasonal

RNA also operates charter flights, including several local top division sports clubs, such as Adler Mannheim and TSG 1899 Hoffenheim.

Former destinations 
 Berlin - Berlin Tegel Airport
 Münster/Osnabrück - Münster Osnabrück International Airport  seasonal
 Nuremberg - Nuremberg Airport seasonal

Fleet

As of 2022, MHS Aviation operates the following aircraft for Rhein-Neckar Air:

References

2014 establishments in Germany
Companies based in Mannheim